The Daylami language, also known as Daylamite, Deilami, Dailamite, or Deylami (Deilami: , from the name of the Daylam region), is an extinct language that was one of the northwestern branch of the Iranian languages. It was spoken in northern Iran, specifically in the mountainous area in Gīlān.

Parviz Natel Khanlari listed this language as one of Iranian dialects spoken between the 9th and 13th centuries. Istakhri, a medieval Iranian geographer, has written about this language, as did Al-Muqaddasi, a medieval Arab geographer, who wrote "they have an obscure language and they use the phoneme khe /x/ a lot." Abū Esḥāq Ṣābī had a similar report on people in the Deylam highlands who spoke a distinct language.

According to Wilfered Madelung, in the early Islamic period the language of the Deylamites was a northwestern Iranian language. One of the characteristics of this language was an added ī sound between consonants and ā (Lāhījān=Līāhījān, Amīrkā=Amīrkīā).

Notes

Northwestern Iranian languages
Languages of Iran
Extinct languages of Asia
Languages attested from the 9th century
Languages extinct in the 13th century
Caspian languages